The Treason by Women Act (Ireland) 1796 (36 Geo 3 c 31 (I)) was an Act of the Parliament of the Kingdom of Ireland which reduced the penalty for women convicted of high treason and petty treason from death by burning to death by hanging. It was the Irish equivalent of the Treason Act 1790 passed by the Parliament of the Kingdom of Great Britain.

In the Republic of Ireland, the act was explicitly repealed by the Statute Law Revision (Pre-Union Irish Statutes) Act 1962.

In Northern Ireland, the short title was assigned in 1951, and the act was explicitly repealed on 30 September 1998 by the Crime and Disorder Act 1998.

See also
Treason Act

References

External links

Acts of the Parliament of Ireland (pre-1801)
1796 in law
1796 in Ireland
Treason in Ireland
Women's rights in Ireland
Death penalty law